Dendrobium tortile is a species of orchid, commonly known as the twisted dendrobium. It is native across Southeast Asia, and in Bangladesh, Assam state of India, and the Andaman Islands.

References

External links 
 
 

tortile
Flora of Indo-China
Orchids of Assam
Orchids of Bangladesh
Plants described in 1847